Jacob Le Roy Milligan (March 9, 1889 – March 9, 1951) was a United States Representative from Missouri.

Biography
Born in Richmond, Missouri, Milligan attended the public schools and the law department of the University of Missouri 1910-1914.

He was admitted to the bar in 1913 and commenced practice in Richmond, in 1914. During World War I, he enlisted in the Sixth Regiment, Missouri Infantry, on April 8, 1917. He served as captain of Company G, One Hundred and Fortieth Infantry Regiment, Thirty-fifth Division, from August 4, 1917, to May 15, 1919. He received the Purple Heart and Silver Star. He returned April 28, 1919.

Milligan was elected as a Democrat to the Sixty-sixth Congress to fill the vacancy caused by the resignation of Joshua W. Alexander and served from February 14, 1920, to March 3, 1921. He was an unsuccessful candidate for reelection in 1920 to the Sixty-seventh Congress. He later served as delegate to the Democratic National Convention in 1928.

Milligan was elected to the Sixty-eighth and to the five succeeding Congresses (March 4, 1923 – January 3, 1935). He was not a candidate for renomination in 1934 but was an unsuccessful candidate for nomination for United States Senator. He and fellow Representative John J. Cochran were defeated by Harry S. Truman. Jacob Milligan's brother Maurice M. Milligan challenged Truman in the Democratic primary for his reelection campaign in 1940.

Jacob Milligan resumed the practice of law and served as president of Kansas City Police Board from 1949 to 1950.

He died in Kansas City, Missouri on his sixty-second birthday, March 9, 1951, and was interred in Fairview Cemetery, Liberty, Missouri.

References

1889 births
1951 deaths
University of Missouri alumni
United States Army officers
People from Richmond, Missouri
Democratic Party members of the United States House of Representatives from Missouri
20th-century American politicians